Bertha Townsend defeated Marion Wright 6–2, 6–2 in the All Comers' Final of the 1888 U.S. Women's National Singles tennis championship. Bertha Townsend defeated reigning champion Ellen Hansell 6–3, 6–5 in the Challenge Round. The event was held at the Philadelphia Cricket Club, Pennsylvania.

Draw

Challenge round

All Comers' finals

References

1888
1888 in American women's sports
Women's Singles
1888 in women's tennis
Women's sports in Pennsylvania
1888 in Pennsylvania